Butterfly Rocket is Nikka Costa's fourth studio record and first "adult" album, released in 1996 in Australia on Mushroom Records.

Track listing

Later copies of the album were released with the limited edition bonus CD "Live at the Bridge". The songs were recorded live at The Bridge Hotel in November, 1996.

Singles
Released only in Australia as promotional singles
 Master Blaster

† Same as the album version

 Get Off My Sunshine

 Treat Her Right

External links
Nikka Costa official website

1996 albums
Nikka Costa albums
Mushroom Records albums